Lizzie Douglas (June 3, 1897 – August 6, 1973), better known as Memphis Minnie, was a blues guitarist, vocalist, and songwriter whose recording career lasted for over three decades. She recorded around 200 songs, some of the best known being "When the Levee Breaks", "Me and My Chauffeur Blues", "Bumble Bee" and "Nothing in Rambling".

Childhood 
Douglas was born on June 3, 1897, probably in Tunica County, Mississippi, although she claimed to have been born in New Orleans, Louisiana and raised in the Algiers neighborhood.  She was the eldest of 13 siblings. Her parents, Abe and Gertrude Douglas, nicknamed her Kid when she was young, and her family called her that throughout her childhood. It is reported that she disliked the name Lizzie. When she first began performing, she played under the name Kid Douglas.

When she was seven years old, she and her family moved to Walls, Mississippi, south of Memphis, Tennessee. The following year, she received her first guitar, as a Christmas present. She learned to play the banjo by the age of 10 and the guitar by the age of 11, when she started playing at parties. The family later moved to Brunswick, Tennessee. After Minnie's mother died, in 1922, Abe Douglas moved back to Walls, where he died in 1935.

Career
In 1910, at the age of 13, she ran away from home to live on Beale Street, in Memphis. She played on street corners for most of her teenage years, occasionally returning to her family's farm when she ran out of money. Her sidewalk performances led to a tour of the South with the Ringling Brothers Circus from 1916 to 1920. She then went back to Beale Street, with its thriving blues scene, and made her living by playing guitar and singing, supplementing her income with sex work (at that time, it was not uncommon for female performers to turn to sex work out of financial need).

She began performing with Joe McCoy, her second husband, in 1929. They were discovered by a talent scout for Columbia Records, in front of a barber shop, where they were playing for dimes. She and McCoy went to record in New York City and were given the names Kansas Joe and Memphis Minnie by a Columbia A&R man. Over the next few years she and McCoy released a series of records, performing as a duet. In February 1930 they recorded the song "Bumble Bee" for the Vocalion label, which they had already recorded for Columbia but which had not yet been released. It became one of Minnie's most popular songs; she eventually recorded five versions of it. Minnie and McCoy continued to record for Vocalion until August 1934, when they recorded a few sessions for Decca Records. Their last session together was for Decca, in September. They divorced in 1935.

An anecdote from Big Bill Broonzy's autobiography, Big Bill Blues, recounts a cutting contest between Minnie and Broonzy in a Chicago nightclub on June 26, 1933, for the prize of a bottle of whiskey and a bottle of gin. Each singer was to sing two songs; after Broonzy sang "Just a Dream" and "Make My Getaway," Minnie won the prize with "Me and My Chauffeur Blues" and "Looking the World Over". Paul and Beth Garon, in their biography Woman with Guitar: Memphis Minnie's Blues, suggested that Broonzy's account may have combined various contests at different dates, as these songs of Minnie's date from the 1940s rather than the 1930s.

By 1935, Minnie was established in Chicago and had become one of a group of musicians who worked regularly for the record producer and talent scout Lester Melrose. Back on her own after her divorce from McCoy, Minnie began to experiment with different styles and sounds. She recorded four sides for Bluebird Records in July 1935, returned to the Vocalion label in August, and then recorded another session for Bluebird in October, this time accompanied by Casey Bill Weldon, her first husband. By the end of the 1930s, in addition to her output for Vocalion, she had recorded nearly 20 sides for Decca and eight sides for Bluebird. She also toured extensively in the 1930s, mainly in the South.

In 1938, Minnie returned to recording for the Vocalion label, this time accompanied by Charlie McCoy, Kansas Joe's brother, on mandolin. Around this time she married the guitarist and singer Ernest Lawlars, known as Little Son Joe. They began recording together in 1939, with Son adding a more rhythmic backing to Minnie's guitar. They recorded for Okeh Records in the 1940s and continued to record together through the decade. By 1941 Minnie had started playing electric guitar, and in May of that year she recorded her biggest hit, "Me and My Chauffeur Blues". A follow-up date produced two more blues standards, "Looking the World Over" and Lawlars's "Black Rat Swing" (issued under the name "Mr. Memphis Minnie"). In the 1940s Minnie and Lawlars continued to work at their "home club," Chicago's popular 708 Club, where they were often joined by Broonzy, Sunnyland Slim, or Snooky Pryor, and also played at many of the other better-known Chicago nightclubs. During the 1940s Minnie and Lawlars performed together and separately in the Chicago and Indiana areas. Minnie often played at "Blue Monday" parties at Ruby Lee Gatewood's, on Lake Street. The poet Langston Hughes, who saw her perform at the 230 Club on New Year's Eve, 1942, wrote of her "hard and strong voice" being made harder and stronger by amplification and described the sound of her electric guitar as "a musical version of electric welders plus a rolling mill."

Later in the 1940s, Minnie lived in Indianapolis and Detroit. She returned to Chicago in the early 1950s. By the late 1940s, clubs had begun hiring younger and cheaper artists, and Columbia had begun dropping blues artists, including Memphis Minnie. Unable to adapt to changing tastes, she moved to smaller labels, such as Regal, Checker, and J.O.B.

Later life and death

Minnie continued to record into the 1950s, but her health began to decline. With public interest in her music waning, she retired from her musical career, and in 1957 she and Lawlars returned to Memphis. Periodically, she appeared on Memphis radio stations to encourage young blues musicians. In 1958 she played at a memorial concert for Big Bill Broonzy.  As the Garons wrote in Woman with Guitar, "She never laid her guitar down, until she could literally no longer pick it up." She suffered a stroke in 1960, which left her confined to a wheelchair. Lawlars died the following year, and Minnie had another stroke a short while after. She could no longer survive on her Social Security income. Magazines wrote about her plight, and readers sent her money for assistance. She spent her last years in the Jell Nursing Home, in Memphis, where she died of a stroke in 1973. She is buried at the New Hope Baptist Church Cemetery, in Walls, DeSoto County, Mississippi. A headstone paid for by Bonnie Raitt was erected by the Mount Zion Memorial Fund on October 13, 1996, with 34 family members in attendance, including her sister Bob. The ceremony was taped for broadcast by the BBC.
Her headstone is inscribed:

The inscription on the back of her gravestone reads:

The hundreds of sides Minnie recorded are the perfect material to teach us about the blues. For the blues are at once general, and particular, speaking for millions, but in a highly singular, individual voice. Listening to Minnie's songs we hear her fantasies, her dreams, her desires, but we will hear them as if they were our own.

Character and personal life
Minnie was known as a polished professional and an independent woman who knew how to take care of herself. She presented herself to the public as being feminine and ladylike, wearing expensive dresses and jewelry, but she was aggressive when she needed to be and was not shy when it came to fighting. According to the blues musician Johnny Shines, "Any men fool with her she'd go for them right away. She didn't take no foolishness off them. Guitar, pocket knife, pistol, anything she get her hand on she'd use it". According to Homesick James, she chewed tobacco all the time, even while singing or playing the guitar, and always had a cup at hand in case she wanted to spit. Most of the music she made was autobiographical; Minnie expressed a lot of her personal life in music.

Minnie was married three times, although no marriage certificates have been found. It is believed that her first husband was Casey Bill Weldon, whom she married in the early 1920s. Her second husband was the guitarist and mandolin player Kansas Joe McCoy, whom she married in 1929. They filed for divorce in 1934. McCoy's jealousy of Minnie's professional success has been given as one reason for the breakup of their marriage. Around 1938 she met the guitarist Ernest Lawlars (Little Son Joe), who became her new musical partner, and they married shortly thereafter; Minnie's union records, covering 1939 onwards, give her name as Minnie Lawlars. He dedicated songs to her, including "Key to the World", in which he addresses her as "the woman I got now" and calls her "the key to the world." Minnie was also reported to have lived with a man known as "Squirrel" in the mid- to late 1930s.

Minnie was not religious and rarely went to church; the only time she was reported to have gone to church was to see a gospel group perform. She was baptized shortly before she died, probably to please her sister Daisy Johnson. A house in Memphis where she once lived, at 1355 Adelaide Street, still exists.

Legacy
Memphis Minnie has been described as "the most popular female country blues singer of all time". Big Bill Broonzy said that she could "pick a guitar and sing as good as any man I've ever heard." Minnie lived to see a renewed appreciation of her recorded work during the revival of interest in blues music in the 1960s. She was an influence on later singers, such as Big Mama Thornton, Jo Ann Kelly and Erin Harpe. She was inducted into the Blues Foundation's Hall of Fame in 1980.

"Me and My Chauffeur Blues" was recorded by Jefferson Airplane on their debut album, Jefferson Airplane Takes Off, with Signe Anderson as lead vocalist. "Can I Do It for You" was recorded by Donovan in 1965, under the title "Hey Gyp (Dig the Slowness)". A 1929 Memphis Minnie and Kansas Joe McCoy song, "When the Levee Breaks", was adapted (with altered lyrics and a different melody) by Led Zeppelin and released in 1971 on their fourth album. "I'm Sailin'" was covered by Mazzy Star on their 1990 debut album, She Hangs Brightly.
Her family is currently suing record companies and some artists for royalties and for using her music without permission.
In 2007, Minnie was honored with a marker on the Mississippi Blues Trail in Walls, Mississippi.

Songs

Discography

Compilations

References

Sources
Garon, Paul, and Garon, Beth (1992). Woman with Guitar: Memphis Minnie's Blues. New York: Da Capo Press.
Harris, S, (1989). Blues Who's Who. 5th paperback ed. New York: Da Capo Press.

External links

 Listen to "When the Levee Breaks" at the "Internet Archive" (archive.org)
 Delta Blues Bio and Samples of "Bumble Bee Blues" and "Soo Cow Soo"
 Mount Zion memorial Fund
 Amazon.com
 Cr.nps.gov
 Discogs.com
 Sundayblues.org

1897 births
1973 deaths
Musicians from Memphis, Tennessee
20th-century African-American women singers
African-American women singer-songwriters
American blues guitarists
American blues singers
American street performers
Columbia Records artists
Bluebird Records artists
Country blues musicians
Memphis blues musicians
Savoy Records artists
Vaudeville performers
Vocalion Records artists
African-American guitarists
Singer-songwriters from Tennessee
Guitarists from Tennessee
Okeh Records artists
Decca Records artists
Checker Records artists
Mississippi Blues Trail
20th-century American women guitarists
African American female guitarists